The Vengeance of Jago (Italian:Lo spettro di Jago) is a 1912 Italian silent film directed by Alberto Carlo Lolli. It was an early hit for the Aquila Films company.

References

Bibliography
 Abel, Richard. Encyclopedia of Early Cinema. Taylor & Francis, 2005.

External links

1912 films
1910s Italian-language films
Films directed by Alberto Carlo Lolli
Italian silent short films
Italian black-and-white films
1912 short films